Quarterly Essay is an Australian periodical that straddles the border between magazines and non-fiction books.  Printed in a book-like page size and using a single-column format, each issue features a single extended essay of at least 20,000 words, with an introduction by the editor, and correspondence relating to essays in previous issues.  It was founded in 2001. 

Concentrating primarily on Australian politics in a broad sense, the magazine's issues have covered topics including profiles of Mark Latham, to the U.S. military's failure to grasp the importance of tribal affiliation in Iraq, and the "cult" of the CEO.
Its small circulation of a few thousand copies belies the impact it has had, with many ideas in a number of essays impacting the wider public debates on those issues through their repetition in more widely circulated media.

Founding editor Peter Craven was sacked by the magazine's owner, property developer Morry Schwartz, in early 2004 over a dispute about the joint authorship of one essay, and, more widely, the magazine's future direction.  Schwartz stated that while he had a vision of the magazine as more "political and Australian" whereas Craven was perhaps "more broad and internationalist".

List of Quarterly Essay editions

Notes

External links
 Quarterly Essay

2001 establishments in Australia
News magazines published in Australia
Magazines established in 2001
Quarterly magazines published in Australia